Roger Ballenger (September 25, 1950 – October 27, 2019) was an American politician. He served in the Oklahoma Senate, representing district 8, which includes McIntosh, Okfuskee, Okmulgee and Tulsa counties, from 2006 to 2014.

He died of melanoma on October 27, 2019, in Okmulgee, Oklahoma at age 69.

References

External links
Senator Roger Ballenger - District 8 official State Senate website
Project Vote Smart - Roger Ballenger (OK) profile
Follow the Money - Roger Ballenger
2008 2006 campaign contributions

1950 births
2019 deaths
People from Okmulgee, Oklahoma
Democratic Party Oklahoma state senators
21st-century American politicians